Georgios Tsalmpouris (alternate spelling: Giorgos Tsalbouris) (Greek: Γιώργος Τσαλμπούρης; born 22 June 1996 in Veroia, Greece) is a Greek professional basketball player for Bilbao of the Spanish Liga ACB. He is 7'2" (2.18 m) tall, weighs 235 pounds (107 kg), and plays the center position.

Early career
Tsalmpouris played club basketball with Archelaos Pierikos in the Greek B Basket League, the 3rd level of Greek the basketball system, at the semi-professional level, in the 2013–14 season.

College career
In the 2014–15 season, Tsalmpouris played Division I college basketball for the   Iowa State Cyclones team. He was the seventh 7-footer in the school's history. He played in 8 games, and averaged 1.4 points, 0.8 rebounds, 0.3 assists, and 0.1 steals per game, in 4.4 minutes per game. In August 2015, after playing one season with Iowa State, Tsalmpouris left the school, and returned to Greece to play professionally.

Professional career
In August 2015, Tsalmpouris signed a five-year contract with the Greek Basket League club AEK Athens. Tsalmpouris then became automatically draft eligible 2 years early, due to having played a year of professional basketball, right after a year of NCAA Division I college basketball, as well as previously playing under a start-up national basketball league, before participating in college basketball. So he was thus automatically entered into the 2016 NBA Draft, but was not drafted after two rounds.

In 2017, he was loaned by AEK to Kolossos Rodou. He returned to AEK for the 2018-2019 season, winning the 2019 FIBA Intercontinental Cup in the process, before going back to Kolossos on a free transfer in the summer of 2019. On September 12, 2020, Tsalmpouris signed with PAOK of the Greek Basket League. On December 3, 2020, he recorded a career high 22 points against Aris Thessaloniki. 

On August 22, 2021, Tsalmpouris moved to Apollon Patras, where he enjoyed a very successful 2021-2022 campaign. In a total of 24 league games, he averaged 14.9 points (2nd overall scorer in the Greek Basket League) and 5.6 rebounds, playing around 32 minutes per contest.

On September 23, 2022, he signed with Real Betis of the Spanish Liga ACB. On February 17, 2023, he parted ways with the club. In 16 games, he averaged 8.8 points and 2.9 rebounds per contest.

On February 26, 2023, he signed with Bilbao of the Spanish Liga ACB.

National team career

Greek junior national team
Tsalmpouris was a member of the junior national teams of Greece. With Greece's junior national teams, he played at the following tournaments: the 2012 FIBA Europe Under-16 Championship, the 2014 FIBA Europe Under-18 Championship, the 2015 FIBA under-19 World Cup, the 2015 FIBA Europe Under-20 Championship, and the 2016 FIBA Europe Under-20 Championship Division B, where he won a bronze medal.

Greek senior national team
Tsalmpouris became a member of the senior men's Greek national basketball team in 2017.

Career statistics

Domestic Leagues

Regular season

|-
| 2015–16
| style="text-align:left;"| A.E.K.
| align=center | GBL
| 0 || -  ||- || - || - || - || - || - || - || - 
|-
| 2016–17
| style="text-align:left;"| A.E.K.
| align=center | GBL
| 14 || 7.0 || .487 || .364 || .750 || 1.1 || .2 || .1 || .3 || 3.2
|-
| 2017–18
| style="text-align:left;"| A.E.K.
| align=center | GBL
| 3 || 6.2 || .300 || .000 || .500 || 1.0 || 0 || .5 || 0 || 2.3
|-
| 2017–18
| style="text-align:left;"| Kolossos
| align=center | GBL
| 16 || 10.5 || .386 || .313 || .375 || 1.9 || .4 || .1 || .3 || 3.6
|-
| 2018–19
| style="text-align:left;"| A.E.K.
| align=center | GBL
| 21 || 10.0 || .571 || .350 || .723 || 1.8 || .2 || .3 || .2 || 3.7
|}

Playoffs

|-
| 2015–16
| style="text-align:left;"| A.E.K.
| align=center | GBL
| 1 || 2.4 || .000 || .000 || - || 1.0 || 0 || 0 || 1.0 || 0
|-
| 2016–17
| style="text-align:left;"| A.E.K.
| align=center | GBL
| 0 || - || - || - || - || - || - || - || - || -
|-
| 2017–18
| style="text-align:left;"| Kolossos
| align=center | GBL
| 2 || 15.4 || .462 || .333 || .667 || 1.5 || 0.0 || 0.5 || 0.5 || 8.0
|}

FIBA Champions League

|-
| style="text-align:left;" | 2016–17
| style="text-align:left;" | A.E.K.
| 7 || 9.4 || .391 || .111 || .857 || 1.1 || .6 || .3 || .3 || 3.6
|-
| style="text-align:left;" | 2018–19
| style="text-align:left;" | A.E.K.
| 12 || 7.5 || .400 || .273 || .714 || .7 || .4 || .2 || .5 || 2.0
|}

References

External links
EuroCup Profile
FIBA Champions League Profile
FIBA Profile (archive)
Eurobasket.com Profile
Hellenic Federation Profile 
Greek League Profile 
Greek League Profile 
NBADraft.net Profile
Draftexpress.com Profile 

1996 births
Living people
AEK B.C. players
Apollon Patras B.C. players
Centers (basketball)
Greek Basket League players
Greek expatriate basketball people in Spain
Greek expatriate basketball people in the United States
Greek men's basketball players
Iowa State Cyclones men's basketball players
Kolossos Rodou B.C. players
P.A.O.K. BC players
Power forwards (basketball)
Real Betis Baloncesto players
Sportspeople from Veria